Helvetica Chimica Acta is a peer-reviewed scientific journal of chemistry established by the Swiss Chemical Society. It is published online by John Wiley & Sons. The journal has a 2020 impact factor of 2.164.

History
August 6, 1901: Founding of the Swiss Chemical Society
1911: IUPAC refused SCG as a member, no own journal
September 11, 1917: SCG founded HCA
1917–1948: First editor-in-chief: Friedrich Fichter (1869–1952)
Spring 1918: Fasciculus I of Volume I of HCA was issued
1948–1971: Emile Cherbuliez (1891–1985)
1970: English allowed as fourth language
1971–1983: Edgardo Giovannini (1909–2004)
1983–2015: M. Volkan Kisakürek
2015-2016: Richard J. Smith
2016–2021: Jeffrey W. Bode and Christophe Copéret
2022–present: Eva Hevia and Jérôme Waser

References

External links

Chemistry journals